Guru Da Banda is a 2018 Indian Punjabi-language animated historical drama film about Banda Singh Bahadur directed by Jassi Chana. Produced by Joginder Singh Bhangalia and Sonu Bhangalia under the banner Pritam Films Production, the film was released on 24 August 2018.

References

External links 
 
 

2018 films
Punjabi-language Indian films
2010s Punjabi-language films
Indian animated films
Films about Sikhism
Indian computer-animated films
Films set in the Mughal Empire
Films set in the Sikh Empire
Cultural depictions of Sikh gurus
Indian historical drama films
Indian films based on actual events
Animated films based on actual events
Animated historical films